Paulus, or Pieter van den Bosch (1612 – c.1673), was a Dutch Golden Age painter.

Biography
He was born in Amsterdam and in October 1650 declared that he was 37 years old. He is known for genre works and fruit and flower still lifes, and moved to London in December 1663 where he later died before 1683.

He is not to be confused with the earlier Pieter van den Bosch (1604-1649) of Leiden.

References

Paul van den Bosch on Artnet

1612 births
1670s deaths
Dutch Golden Age painters
Dutch male painters
Painters from Amsterdam
Dutch still life painters